Zawory  (Cashubian Zôwòrë) is a village in Kartuzy County, Pomeranian Voivodeship, Kashubia in northern Poland. It is the seat of the gmina (administrative district) called Gmina Chmielno. is a village in the administrative district of Gmina Chmielno, within Kartuzy County, Pomeranian Voivodeship, in northern Poland.

For details of the history of the region, see History of Pomerania.

The village has a population of 394.

References

Zawory